Gerlachov, derived from the Germanic name Gerlach with Slavic suffix -ov, may refer to:

Gerlachov, Bardejov District, Slovakia
Gerlachov, Poprad District, Slovakia
Gerlachovský štít, highest peak in Slovakia